Richard Hakluyt (born by 1531 – died 1591), of the Middle Temple, London and Eyton in Leominster, Herefordshire, was an English barrister, a cousin of his more famous namesake.

In 1558 Hakluyt was briefly a Member of the Parliament of England for Leominster. In 1571 he was appointed Commissioner for Customs and became a bencher of the Middle Temple in May 1585. His Will was proved in 1591.

References

1591 deaths
English MPs 1558
Members of the Middle Temple
People from Leominster
Year of birth uncertain